This Other Eden may refer to:

This Other Eden (film), a 1959 Irish comedy drama film directed by Muriel Box 
This Other Eden (Elton novel), a 1993 satirical novel written by Ben Elton
This Other Eden (Harding novel), a 2023 novel by Paul Harding
This Other Eden: Seven Great Gardens and 300 Years of English History, a 2005 reference book by Andrea Wulf and Emma Gieben-Gamal